Vladimir Georgievich Bulatov (30 June 1929 – 19 February 1976) was a Soviet athlete. He competed in the men's pole vault at the 1956 Summer Olympics.

References

1929 births
1976 deaths
Athletes (track and field) at the 1956 Summer Olympics
Soviet male pole vaulters
Olympic athletes of the Soviet Union
Place of birth missing